Chernyakhovsky (masculine), Chernyakhovskaya (feminine), or Chernyakhovskoye (neuter) may refer to:
Ivan Chernyakhovsky (1906–1945), Soviet General of the Army
Chernyakhovsky District, a district of Kaliningrad Oblast, Russia
Chernyakhovskoye Urban Settlement, a municipal formation which the town of district significance of Chernyakhovsk in Chernyakhovsky District of Kaliningrad Oblast, Russia is incorporated as
24968 Chernyakhovsky, an asteroid

See also
Chernyakhovsk
Chernyakhov culture